The 2015–16 Louisville Cardinals men's basketball team represented the University of Louisville during the 2015–16 NCAA Division I men's basketball season. This was Louisville's 102nd season of intercollegiate competition. The Cardinals competed in their second season in the Atlantic Coast Conference and were coached by Rick Pitino, in his 15th season at U of L. The team played its home games on Denny Crum Court at the KFC Yum! Center in downtown Louisville. They finished the season 23–8, 12–6 in ACC play to finish in fourth place.

The University of Louisville self-imposed a postseason ban for the 2015–16 season amid an ongoing NCAA investigation over an escort sex scandal involving recruits between 2010 and 2014. None of the players on this team were involved in the allegations. The ban included both the ACC tournament and the NCAA tournament.

Previous season
The Cardinals finished the 2014–15 season with a record of 27–9, 12-6 to finish in fourth place in ACC play. Louisville lost its first ever ACC tournament game to North Carolina, but received an at-large bid to the NCAA tournament. Louisville defeated UC Irvine, Northern Iowa, and NC State to advance to the Elite Eight where they lost to Michigan State.

Departures

Incoming transfers

Class of 2015 signees

Class of 2016 signees

Roster

Schedule

|-
!colspan=12 style=| Exhibition

|-
!colspan=12 style=| Non-conference regular season

|-
!colspan=9 style=|ACC regular season

Rankings

* Following the announcement of their self-imposed postseason ban, they were no longer eligible for ranking in the coaches poll.

References

Louisville
Louisville Cardinals men's basketball seasons
Louisville Cardinals men's basketball, 2015-16
Louisville Cardinals men's basketball, 2015-16